Trzcianki may refer to the following places:
Trzcianki, Puławy County in Lublin Voivodeship (east Poland)
Trzcianki, Ryki County in Lublin Voivodeship (east Poland)
Trzcianki, Świętokrzyskie Voivodeship (south-central Poland)
Trzcianki, Greater Poland Voivodeship (west-central Poland)